Tito Vera (born 1 April 1952) is a Paraguayan footballer. He played in ten matches for the Paraguay national football team from 1976 to 1979. He was also part of Paraguay's squad for the 1979 Copa América tournament.

References

External links
 

1952 births
Living people
Paraguayan footballers
Paraguay international footballers
Place of birth missing (living people)
Association football midfielders
Club Libertad footballers
Deportivo Recoleta footballers
River Plate (Asunción) footballers